The Readington Township Public Schools is a community public school district that serves students in pre-kindergarten through eighth grade from Readington Township, in Hunterdon County, New Jersey, United States.

As of the 2018–19 school year, the district, comprising four schools, had an enrollment of 1,495 students and 161.1 classroom teachers (on an FTE basis), for a student–teacher ratio of 9.3:1.

The district is classified by the New Jersey Department of Education as being in District Factor Group "I", the second-highest of eight groupings. District Factor Groups organize districts statewide to allow comparison by common socioeconomic characteristics of the local districts. From lowest socioeconomic status to highest, the categories are A, B, CD, DE, FG, GH, I and J.

Students in public school for ninth through twelfth grades attend the Hunterdon Central High School, part of the Hunterdon Central Regional High School District, which also serves students in central Hunterdon County from Delaware Township, East Amwell Township, Flemington Borough and Raritan Township. As of the 2018–19 school year, the high school had an enrollment of 2,844 students and 238.8 classroom teachers (on an FTE basis), for a student–teacher ratio of 11.9:1.

Schools 
Schools in the district (with 2018–19 enrollment data from the National Center for Education Statistics) are:
Elementary schools
Three Bridges School with 318 students in grades PreK-3
Kristen Higgins, Principal 
Whitehouse School with 304 students in grades K-3
Ann T. DeRosa, Principal 
Holland Brook School with 319 students in grades 4-5
Paul Nigro, Principal 
Middle school
Readington Middle School with 541 students in grades 6-8
Sharon Moffat, Principal
Jonathan Moss, Assistant Principal

Administration
Core members of the district's administration are:
Jonathan Hart, Superintendent
Jason Bohm, Business Administrator / Board Secretary

Board of education
The district's board of education, with nine members, sets policy and oversees the fiscal and educational operation of the district through its administration. As a Type II school district, the board's trustees are elected directly by voters to serve three-year terms of office on a staggered basis, with three seats up for election each year held (since 2013) as part of the November general election.

References

External links 
Readington Township Public Schools

School Data for the Readington Township Public Schools, National Center for Education Statistics
Hunterdon Central Regional High School District

Readington Township, New Jersey
New Jersey District Factor Group I
School districts in Hunterdon County, New Jersey